Scrobipalpa camphorosmella is a moth in the family Gelechiidae. It was described by Jacques Nel in 1999. It is found in southern France and Spain.

The larvae feed on Camphorosma monspeliaca.

References

Scrobipalpa
Moths described in 1999